Operation Castle was a United States series of high-yield (high-energy) nuclear tests by Joint Task Force 7 (JTF-7) at Bikini Atoll beginning in March 1954. It followed Operation Upshot–Knothole and preceded Operation Teapot.

Conducted as a joint venture between the Atomic Energy Commission (AEC) and the Department of Defense (DoD), the ultimate objective of the operation was to test designs for an aircraft-deliverable thermonuclear weapon. However, ballistic casings, fins and fusing systems would have to be attached.

Operation Castle was considered by government officials to be a success as it proved the feasibility of deployable "dry" fuel designs for thermonuclear weapons. There were technical difficulties with some of the tests: one device had a yield much lower than predicted (a "fizzle"), while two other bombs detonated with over twice their predicted yields. One test in particular, Castle Bravo, resulted in extensive radiological contamination. The fallout affected nearby islands including inhabitants and U.S. soldiers stationed there, as well as a nearby Japanese fishing boat (the Daigo Fukuryū Maru), resulting in one direct fatality, and then continued health problems for many of those exposed. Public reaction to the tests and an awareness of the long-range effects of nuclear fallout has been attributed as being part of the motivation for the Partial Test Ban Treaty of 1963.

Background

Bikini Atoll had previously hosted nuclear testing in 1946 as part of Operation Crossroads where the world's fourth and fifth atomic weapons were detonated in Bikini Lagoon. Since then, American nuclear weapons testing had moved to the Enewetak Atoll to take advantage of generally larger islands and deeper water. Both atolls were part of the American Pacific Proving Grounds.

The extremely high yields of the Castle weapons caused concern within the AEC that potential damage to the limited infrastructure already established at Enewetak would delay other operations.

The Ivy Mike test was the world's first "hydrogen bomb", producing a full-scale thermonuclear or fusion explosion. The Ivy Mike device used liquid deuterium, an isotope of hydrogen, making it a "wet" bomb. The complex dewar mechanisms needed to store the liquid deuterium at cryogenic temperatures made the device three stories tall and 82 tons in total weight, far too heavy and bulky to be a usable weapon. With the success of Ivy Mike as proof of the Teller-Ulam bomb concept, research began on using a "dry" fuel to make a practical fusion weapon so that the United States could begin production and deployment of thermonuclear weapons in quantity. The final result incorporated lithium deuteride as the fusion fuel in the Teller-Ulam design, vastly reducing size and weight and simplifying the overall design. Operation Castle was charted to test four dry fuel designs, two wet bombs, and one smaller device. The approval for Operation Castle was issued to JTF-7 by Major General Kenneth D. Nichols, the General Manager of the AEC, on January 21, 1954.

Experiments
Operation Castle was organized into seven experiments, all but one of which were to take place at Bikini Atoll. Below is the original test schedule (as of February 1954).

The Echo test was canceled due to the liquid fuel design becoming obsolete with the success of dry-fueled Bravo as noted above. Yankee was similarly considered obsolete and the Jughead device was replaced with a "Runt II" device (similar to the Union device), which was hastily completed at Los Alamos and flown to Bikini. With this revision, both of the wet fuel devices were removed from the test schedule.

Operation Castle was intended to test lithium deuteride (LiD) as a thermonuclear fusion fuel. A solid at room temperature, LiD, if it worked, would be far more practical than the cryogenic liquid deuterium fuel in the Ivy Mike device. The same Teller-Ulam principle would be used as in the Ivy Mike so-called "Sausage" device, but the fusion reactions were different. Ivy Mike fused deuterium with deuterium, but the LiD devices would fuse deuterium with tritium. The tritium was produced during the explosion by irradiating the lithium with fast neutrons.

Bravo, Yankee (II), and Union used lithium enriched in the Li-6 isotope (Bravo and Yankee used lithium enriched to 40% Li-6, while the lithium used in Union was enriched to 95% Li-6), while Romeo and Koon were fueled with natural lithium (92% Li-7, 7.5% Li-6). The use of natural lithium would be important to the ability of the US to rapidly expand its nuclear stockpile during the Cold War nuclear arms race, since the so-called "Alloy Development Plants" were in an early stage at the time Castle was carried out. The first plant started production in late 1953.

As a hedge, development of liquid deuterium weapons continued in parallel. Even though they were much less practical because of the logistical problems dealing with the transport, handling, and storage of a cryogenic device, the Cold War arms race drove the demand for a viable fusion weapon. The "Ramrod" and "Jughead" devices were liquid fuel designs greatly reduced in size and weight from their so-called "Sausage" predecessor. The "Jughead" device was eventually weaponized, and it saw limited fielding by the U.S. Air Force until the "dry" fuel H-bombs became common.

Nectar was not a fusion weapon in the same sense as the rest of the Castle series. Even though it used lithium fuel for fission boosting, the principal reaction material in the second stage was uranium and plutonium. Similar to the Teller-Ulam configuration, a nuclear fission explosion was used to create high temperatures and pressures to compress a second fissionable mass. This would have otherwise been too large to sustain an efficient reaction if it were triggered with conventional explosives. This experiment was intended to develop intermediate yield weapons for expanding the inventory (around 1-2 Mt vs. 4-8).

Many fusion or thermonuclear weapons generate much, or even most, of their yields from fission. Although the U-238 isotope of uranium will not sustain a chain reaction, it still fissions when irradiated by the intense fast neutron flux of a fusion explosion. Because U-238 is plentiful and has no critical mass, it can be added in (in theory) almost unlimited quantities as a tamper around a fusion bomb, helping to contain the fusion reaction and contributing its own fission energy. For example, the fast-fission of the U-238 tamper contributed 77% (8.0 megatons) to the yield of the 10.4 Mt Ivy Mike explosion.

Test execution
The most notable event of Operation Castle was the Castle Bravo test. The dry fuel for Bravo was 40% Li-6 and 60% Li-7. Only the Li-6 was expected to breed tritium for the deuterium-tritium fusion reaction; the Li-7 was expected to be inert. Yet J. Carson Mark, the head of the Los Alamos Theoretical Design Division, had speculated that Bravo could "go big", estimating that the device could produce an explosive yield as much as 20% more than had been originally calculated. It was discovered, because of the unexpected larger yield, that the Li-7 in the device also undergoes breeding that produces tritium. In practice, Bravo exceeded expectations by 150%, yielding 15 Mt — about 1,000 times more powerful than the Little Boy weapon used on Hiroshima. Castle Bravo remains to this day, the largest detonation ever carried out anywhere by the United States, and the fifth largest H-bomb detonation in the world.

Because Castle Bravo greatly exceeded its expected yield, JTF-7 was caught unprepared. Much of the permanent infrastructure on Bikini Atoll was heavily damaged. The ensuing fallout contaminated all of the atoll, so much so, that it could not be approached by JTF-7 for 24 hours after the test, and even then exposure times were limited. As the fallout spread downwind to the east, more atolls were contaminated by radioactive calcium ash from the incinerated underwater coral banks. Although the atolls were evacuated soon after the test, 239 Marshallese on the Utirik, Rongelap, and Ailinginae Atolls were subjected to significant levels of radiation. 28 Americans stationed on the Rongerik Atoll were also exposed. Follow-up studies of the contaminated individuals began soon after the blast as Project 4.1, and though the short-term effects of the radiation exposure for most of the Marshallese were mild and/or hard to correlate, the long-term effects were pronounced. Additionally, 23 Japanese fishermen aboard Daigo Fukuryū Maru were also exposed to high levels of radiation. They suffered symptoms of radiation poisoning, and one crew member died in September 1954.

The heavy contamination and extensive damage from Bravo delayed the rest of the series. A revised test schedule was officially released on April 14, 1954.  The Castle Romeo and Koon tests were complete by the time that this revision was published.

As Operation Castle progressed, the increased yields and fallout caused test locations to be reevaluated. While the majority of the tests were planned for barges near the sand spit of Iroij, some were moved to the craters of Bravo and Union. In addition, Castle Nectar was moved from Bikini Atoll to the crater of Ivy Mike at Eniwetok for expediency, since Bikini was still heavily contaminated from the previous tests.

The final test in Operation Castle took place on May 14, 1954.

{| class="wikitable sortable"
 |+ United States' Castle series tests and detonations
 |-
 !style="background:#ffdead;" | Name 
 !style="background:#efefef;" | Date time (UT)
 !style="background:#ffdead;" | Local time zone
 !style="background:#efefef;" | Location
 !style="background:#ffdead;" | Elevation + height 
 !style="background:#efefef;" | Delivery,purpose 
 !style="background:#efefef;" | Device
 !style="background:#ffdead;" | Yield
 !style="background:#efefef;" class="unsortable" | Fallout
 !style="background:#ffdead;" class="unsortable" | References
 !style="background:#efefef;" class="unsortable" | Notes
 |-
 ! Bravo
 |  18:45:00.0
 | style="text-align:center;" | MHT (11 hrs) || Namu (Charlie), Bikini Atoll 
 |  + 
 | dry surface,weapons development
 | TX-21 "Shrimp"
 | style="text-align:center;" | 
 | 
 | 
 | Used a RACER IV primary. Over twice as powerful as predicted, error in assessing Li-7.  Lethal fallout, killed radioman on Japanese vessel Daigo Fukuryu Maru (Fifth Lucky Dragon); 1 fatality, 93+ injured. Design used in Mk-21/36. Largest US atmospheric detonation.
 |-
 ! Romeo
 |  18:30:00.4
 | style="text-align:center;" | MHT (11 hrs) || Yurochi aka Irioj (Dog), Bikini Atoll 
 | 0 + 
 | barge,weapons development
 | TX/EC-17A "Runt"
 | style="text-align:center;" | 
 | 
 | 
 | Exceeded yield expectations, by almost a factor of 3. Proof test of the Mk-17, deployed as the EC-17.
 |-
 ! Echo(canceled)
 | 
 | style="text-align:center;" | MHT (11 hrs) || Ebiriru (Ruby), Enewetak Atoll 
 |  + 
 | barge,weapons development
 | Cryo design "ramrod"
 | style="text-align:center;" | 
 | 
 | 
 | Scheduled for Castle but not executed, location and time are as planned. It cancelled when the Bravo test was so unexpectedly successful, making cryogenic thermonuclear concepts obsolete.
 |-
 ! Koon
 |  18:20:00.4
 | style="text-align:center;" | MHT (11 hrs) || Eninmen (Tare), Bikini Atoll 
 |  + 
 | dry surface,weapons development
 | "Morgenstern"
 | style="text-align:center;" | 
 | 
 | 
 | UCRL design, last one that Teller worked on, secondary delayed too long, and fizzled at 110 kt yield.
 |-
 ! Union
 |  18:10:00.6
 | style="text-align:center;" | MHT (11 hrs) || Yurochi aka Irioj (Dog), Bikini Atoll 
 | 0 + 
 | barge,weapons development
 | TX-14 w/ RACER IV "Alarm Clock"
 | style="text-align:center;" | 
 | 
 | 
 | Prototype EC-14, used expensive 95% enriched Li-6 fuel, RACER IV primary.
 |-
 ! Yankee 2
 |  18:10:00.1
 | style="text-align:center;" | MHT (11 hrs) || Yurochi aka Irioj (Dog), Bikini Atoll 
 | 0 + 
 | barge,weapons development
 | TX/EC-24 RACER IV "Runt II"
 | style="text-align:center;" | 
 | 
 | 
 | Proof test of TX/EC-24 with a RACER IV primary. After Bravo'''s success, the wet/dry TX/EC-16 Jughead device that was to be tested was discarded for the Runt2 dry device, hence the "2" designation.
 |-
 ! Nectar |  18:20:00.1
 | style="text-align:center;" | MHT (11 hrs) || Elugelab (Flora), Enewetak Atoll 
 | 0 + 
 | barge,weapons development
 | TX-15 COBRA "Zombie"
 | style="text-align:center;" | 
 | 
 | 
 | 
 |}

ResultsOperation Castle was an unqualified success for the implementation of dry fuel devices. The Bravo design was quickly weaponized and is suspected to be the progenitor of the Mk-21 gravity bomb. The Mk-21 design project began on March 26, 1954 (just three weeks after Bravo) with production of 275 weapons beginning in late 1955. Romeo, relying on natural lithium, was rapidly turned into the Mk-17 bomb, the first deployable US thermonuclear weapon, and was available to strategic forces as an Emergency Capability weapon by mid-1954. Most of the Castle dry fuel devices eventually appeared in the inventory and ultimately grandfathered the majority of thermonuclear configurations.

In contrast, the Livermore-designed Koon'' was a failure. Using natural lithium and a heavily modified Teller-Ulam configuration, the test produced only 110 kilotons of an expected 1.5 megaton yield. While engineers at the Radiation Laboratory had hoped it would lead to a promising new field of weapons, it was eventually determined that the design allowed premature heating of the lithium fuel, thereby disrupting the delicate fusion conditions.

Gallery

See also
Katsuko Saruhashi
Operation Redwing

References

External links 

 
 
 
 Operation Castle at The Nuclear Weapon Archive

1950s in the Marshall Islands
1954 in military history
1954 in the environment
1954 in the Trust Territory of the Pacific Islands
Articles containing video clips
C
Castle
Enewetak Atoll nuclear explosive tests
Explosions in 1954
Military projects of the United States